The women's 400 metres at the 2009 World Championships in Athletics was held at the Olympic Stadium on 15, 16 and 18 August. The world-leader prior to the competition, Sanya Richards, was regarded as the favourite in the event, although her previous failure to convert circuit dominance to major championship success raised some doubts. Reigning Olympic and world champion Christine Ohuruogu entered the championships as only the 25th fastest in the world that year, although a low-key run up also preceded her previous victories. Jamaicans Shericka Williams and Novlene Williams-Mills were predicted as possible medallists, while Russian Antonina Krivoshapka held the second fastest time in the world prior to the tournament.

All the favoured athletes made it through the heats and Motswana Amantle Montsho, a 2008 Olympic finalist, had the fastest time of the day with 50.65 seconds. Unusually, two of the race favourites, Richards and Ohuruogu, faced each other in the first round, with the Richards taking first place. The two faced each other again in the semi-finals, and Richards again beat the defending champion. The other two semi-finals were much faster, however, with five athletes breaking 50 seconds. Shericka Williams and Debbie Dunn set personal bests to qualify in the second final, and Montsho and Williams-Mills had run season's best to qualify – Aliann Pompey's national record was not enough to reach the final.

In the final, Richards started the race quickly, leading the first 100 m. Krivoshapka pulled slightly ahead of her at the halfway, but Richards regained the lead on the final bend. She remained in front through the home straight and won in a world-leading 49 seconds flat. Williams overtook Krivoshapka on the final stretch to take silver with a personal best of 49.32 seconds, and the Russian retained third place for the bronze. Williams-Mills was close behind for fourth place, but it was Ohuruogu's fifth-place finish that drew more attention.

Richards, often the fastest 400 m runner on the athletics circuit, won her first major gold medal of her career with the 38th sub-50 clocking of her career – the most of any athlete. After a lacklustre season, the 2007 World Champion Ohuruogu could not repeat the performance that had made her Olympic champion the previous year. Shericka Williams had twice lowered her personal best, and her silver medal-winning performance was 0.02 seconds outside of Lorraine Fenton's Jamaican record. Krivoshapka's bronze was Russia's first medal in the event in the post-Soviet era.

Medalists

Records

Qualification standards

Schedule

Results

Heats
Qualification: First 3 in each heat(Q) and the next 6 fastest(q) advance to the semifinals.

Key:  PB = Personal best, Q = qualification by place in heat, q = qualification by overall place, SB = Seasonal best

Semifinals
Qualification: First 2 in each semifinal(Q) and the next 2 fastest(q) advance to the final.

Key:  DNF = Did not finish, NR = National record, PB = Personal best, Q = qualification by place in heat, q = qualification by overall place, SB = Seasonal best

Final

Key:  PB = Personal best, SB = Seasonal best, WL = World leading (in a given season)

References
General
400 metre results. IAAF. Retrieved on 2009-08-16.
Landells, Steve (2009-08-15). Event Report - Women's 400m - Heats. IAAF. Retrieved on 2009-08-16.
Specific

400 metres
400 metres at the World Athletics Championships
2009 in women's athletics